Peter W. Matts (June 20, 1814 – July 2, 1903) was a member of the Wisconsin State Assembly.

Biography
Matts was born on June 20, 1814 in Bucks County, Pennsylvania. In 1842, he married Helen R. Dickson. They had seven children. Matts and his wife were affiliated with the Second Adventists.

Eventually, Matts settled in Madison, Wisconsin Territory. He settled what is now Paoli, Wisconsin, where he opened the Paoli Mills, now listed on the National Register of Historic Places. Matts also served in the Wisconsin State Militia, achieving the rank of major. He died on July 2, 1903 and was buried in Paoli.

Political career
Matts was elected sheriff of Dane County in 1846 and re-elected in 1848 after statehood as a Whig. He was elected to the Assembly in 1853 and served during the 1854 session as a Republican. Other positions Matts held include chairman (similar to mayor) of the town board (similar to city council) of Montrose, Wisconsin and justice of the peace.

References

External links

People from Bucks County, Pennsylvania
Politicians from Madison, Wisconsin
Members of the Wisconsin State Assembly
Mayors of places in Wisconsin
Wisconsin city council members
Wisconsin sheriffs
American justices of the peace
Wisconsin Republicans
Wisconsin Whigs
Military personnel from Madison, Wisconsin
Military personnel from Pennsylvania
Wisconsin National Guard personnel
Millers
1814 births
1903 deaths
Burials in Wisconsin
People from Montrose, Wisconsin
19th-century American judges